Clanton Park may refer to:

 Clanton Park (Charlotte, North Carolina), a park in Charlotte, North Carolina
 Clanton Park, Toronto, a neighborhood in  Toronto, Ontario, Canada